Cathedral of the Nativity is a cathedral of Volgodonsk Diocese situated in the city of Volgodonsk, Rostov Oblast, Russia. The main temple of Volgodonsk Deanery. The Cathedral and Fyodor Ushakov Chapel located nearby form the Parish of the Nativity.

The Cathedral of the Nativity of Christ was founded on March 7, 2001. It was planned that it would become the main temple of the city and of Volgodonsk Deanery.

However, the construction works had soon been suspended for several years. They were resumed on October 15, 2008. In the period from 2008 to 2011 on the territory of the Nativity Cathedral there had been built and consecrated a small church of St. Fyodor Ushakov, erected a monument dedicated to this prominent admiral, and acquired 13 bells for the belfry. On August 1, 2010 the first Divine Liturgy in the lower chapel of the cathedral was carried out ― in the temple of St. Seraphim of Sarov, named in honor of the patron saint of nuclear energy. In late 2010, four domes were installed, and in the beginning of January 2011 ― the central dome was also added. As a result, the total height of the cathedral was 56 meters, and together with the cross on the central dome ― 58 meters.

At the cathedral area of 8 hectares it is planned to construct a complex of buildings, including bell tower, Sunday school, charity dining hall, icon-painting workshops, publishing center, playgrounds, pilgrimage hotel and Orthodox gymnasium.

In 2011, the temple acquired the status of cathedral of the newly formed Diocese of Volgodonsk.

References 

Russian Orthodox cathedrals in Russia
Churches in Rostov Oblast
2001 establishments in Russia
Churches completed in 2011
21st-century churches in Russia